God's Gift is a 2006 direct to video American drama film directed by Master P produced, and distributed by Guttar Music Entertainment.

Synopsis
The film is based on boxing, and Romeo's struggle with God and school. It also shows his struggle with his father's drinking addiction.

Cast
 Romeo Miller – Romeo
 Zachary Isaiah Williams – Kid Romeo
 Master P – Romeo's father
 Erica Hubbard – Romeo's girlfriend

Production and release 
It was written by Britt O. Wynn. The movie starred Romeo, his father Master P and Romeo's co star from Romeo!, Zachary Isaiah Williams. The movie also had an appearance by Romeo's younger brother, Young V, his uncle Silkk the Shocker, and Lincoln Heights star Erica Hubbard. It was released on July 15, 2006. The movie only opened in cinemas in the United States, and could only be viewed if you purchased the album from his page on MySpace.

See also
God's Gift Soundtrack
List of hood films

References
 https://www.amazon.com/Gods-Gift-DVD-CD-Romeo/dp/B000H7J9GM

2006 films
Films set in New Orleans
American independent films
2000s hip hop films
Hood films
American drama films
2006 drama films
2000s English-language films
2000s American films